Senator Mello may refer to:

Donald R. Mello (born 1934), Nevada State Senate
Heath Mello (born 1979), Nebraska State Senate
Henry J. Mello (1924–2004), California State Senate

See also
Bob Mellow (born 1943), Pennsylvania State Senate